III is the third album by Christian alternative group, Family Force 5, released on October 18, 2011 and the last album to feature Solomon Olds before his departure from the band in 2013. The song "Not Alone" charted at No. 47 on the Hot Christian Songs. The next single, "Get On Outta Here", was free for several days before paid release, where it charted at No. 27 on iTunes Rock chart. Wobble charted at No. 20 on the Alternative charts for a week. "Paycheck" was the final single from the album, but did not chart. However, a music video was made for the song.

Track listing 

Superhero was not released with the physical CD; it was released with the Digital Re-Release version on May 23, 2012.

III.V 
On October 21, the band announced on Facebook that they would release III.V (pronounced "3.5"), which would include brand new recordings such as  "Zombie" and "Cray Button". On March 31, Family Force 5 announced via Twitter and Facebook that III.V was set to be released May 8, 2012.

The EP was released digitally on May 8, 2012, but was not released on iTunes until May 23, 2012.

Track listing

Superhero was added on May 23, 2012

"Cray Button" remix and music video
After the release of the EP, a fan uploaded a photo to Instagram that changed the "Cray button" from the song of the same name to "Lecrae button." The band re-tweeted the edited photo, which in turn sparked calls by fans for the band to do a remix of the song with Lecrae. On August 2, 2012, Lecrae agreed to do a collaboration with the band. On September 24, 2012, a music video for "Cray Button" premiered on Rapzilla. It featured a verse by Lecrae as well as an appearance by YouTube celebrity Meekakitty, who previously used the song "Zombie" in one of her videos. The following day, the remix version with Lecrae was released as a single on iTunes, and the music video was premiered outside of Rapzilla.

Reception

Critical reception for the album was mixed.

Stephen Thomas Erlewine from Allmusic gave the album three out of five stars saying, "As the group bounces from pop to reggae to rap, they sometimes run the risk of seeming condescending, particularly on their hip-hop cuts, which often run the risk of being parody, but the group is saved by their way with melody: they may not arrive there naturally, but they do know how to hammer their hooks home."

AbsolutePunk gave the album a 48% saying "As a long-time fan of Family Force 5, it is disappointing to watch what was once such an enjoyable and energetic beast relegate itself to a trend-follower. FF5's audio identity, consequently, is all but gone. This has, unfortunately, resulted in the band losing what made them so enjoyable to listen to back when they first began: fun."

The Christian Post gave the album a positive review saying "Family Force 5's new album III is a fantastic journey through the innovative musical minds of crunk rock pioneers that paved the way for artists like LMFAO and 3OH!3"

Jesus Freak Hideout gave the album two reviews, one by Roger Gelwicks, who gave the album a mixed review, saying, "As mentioned, some parts of III are better than the whole and are worth the attention of listeners, and one would be wise to solely invest in these aspects. However, as an entire product, III is far more a disappointment than a joy in the end." The other reviewer, Ryan Barbee, gave the album a negative review saying "It's going to be about having a good time and knowing how to party. But with this album, it feels like an awkward step backward. For this listener… the third time is not a charm." Barbee also criticized the lyrical themes of the music, saying "Yes, they are known for their raucous party music, which is always enjoyable, but this go-around, it's almost all about the same content: girls, girls, girls."

Charts

References

2011 albums
Family Force 5 albums